Rhewl may refer to:

 Rhewl (Llanynys, Denbighshire) – a village on the River Clwedog in Denbighshire, Wales, United Kingdom
 Rhewl (Overton, Shropshire) – a place near the village of Overton in Shropshire, England, United Kingdom
 Rhewl (River Dee, Denbighshire) – a place on the River Dee near Llantysilio in Denbighshire, Wales, United Kingdom
 Rhewl (Nant Mawr, Denbighshire) – a place near the Nant Mawr in Denbighshire, Wales, United Kingdom
 Rhewl (Gobowen, Shropshire) – a place near the village of Gobowen in Shropshire, England, United Kingdom